Club One Air is an air charter company in India based on the fractional ownership model. Based in Delhi, Mumbai and Visakhapatnam.

It is Asia's first aircraft fractional ownership company. It launched its operations from Delhi in August 2005 and Mumbai in March 2006.
Club One Air specializes in corporate and tourism charter and also provides medical evacuation services across India.

Fleet

Current fleet
The Club One Air fleet includes the following aircraft:

The company also operates a fleet of Agusta Helicopters.

Former fleet
The airline previously operated the following aircraft (at August 2017):
 1 Bombardier CRJ200

References

 Airliner World Magazine. November 2005. p20.

External links
 Club One Air | Official Website

Airlines of India
Indian companies established in 2005
Airlines established in 2005
2005 establishments in Delhi
Companies based in Delhi